Richwood Township may refer to:

 Richwood Township, Becker County, Minnesota
 Richwood Township, Jersey County, Illinois

See also
 Richwoods Township (disambiguation)

Township name disambiguation pages